Lum and Abner Abroad is a 1956 European comedy film directed by James V. Kern and written by Carl Herzinger. The film stars Chester Lauck, Norris Goff, Jill Alis, Lila Audres, Gene Gary, and Chris Peters. The film was released on January 1, 1956.

Plot
The film consists of three two-reel episodes. In each, Lum and Abner visit a different city in Europe.

In Zagreb, Yugoslavia, the two involve themselves in the disappearance of an American reporter, who is engaged to a local ballerina.
In Paris, France, a thief and his femme fatale co-conspirator plot to use Lum and Abner as pawns to smuggle a valuable figurine out of the country.
In Monte Carlo, Monaco, Lum and Abner are mistaken for two much wealthier Americans; a deadbeat duchess sees them as an easy mark and hopes to get a cut of the duo's losses at the local casino. To her dismay, the two hit a lucky streak and end up making 100 times their wager.

Cast 
Chester Lauck as Lum Edwards
Norris Goff as Abner Peabody
Jill Alis as Marianne Passavetz
Lila Audres as Collette Bleu
Gene Gary as Nikolai Brasnovich
Chris Peters as Croupier 
Nada Nuchich as Lisa Dubroc
Branko Spoljar as Papa Passavetz
Jim Kiley as Tommy Ellis
Steven Voyt as Frankenshpinin
Vera Misita as Duchess Dubroc
Vlado Stefancic as Mischa Dramascu 
Josip Batistic as Dignitary

Background
Lum and Abner Abroad was originally conceived as a television series and a comeback vehicle for the Lum and Abner characters. The duo had appeared in six feature films and a long-running radio series between 1935 and 1950, but other than a short-lived radio revival in 1953, had not appeared in media since then. Lum and Abner had made at least one previous effort to transition to television under the more familiar format of the radio show; like Lum and Abner Abroad, that effort was also unsuccessful, although the pilot episode of the other series also survives.

The six previous Lum and Abner features, produced independently in Hollywood, followed the radio format of Lum and Abner as residents of "Pine Ridge, Arkansas." Lum and Abner Abroad, however, was a European production, with filming and accommodations based in Yugoslavia. According to co-star Chester Lauck, the Yugoslavian crew was so inexperienced and the conditions so primitive that director James V. Kern had to improvise technical shortcuts, like hanging a microphone on a pole to function as a makeshift boom. Kern was credited as both producer and director; the film became Kern's last theatrical film, as he had shifted to television by the 1950s.

Had Lum and Abner Abroad been sponsored as a series, the three shorts would have constituted three half-hour episodes of the series. As the series was not picked up, they were instead hastily strung together and released as a feature film. Although the international actors spoke English and were not dubbed, the finished film lacked the usual Hollywood production Polish, and no major distributor would release it. It was acquired by Howco Productions, a South Carolina-based distributor whose customers were largely based in the American South, and thus might attract Lum and Abner's rural fan base. (The film's main title reads: "Actually Filmed in Europe (Not Pine Ridge).")

Reception 
A retrospective review at TV Guide praised Lum and Abner's performances but criticized the poor editing (fade-outs and fade-ins for commercial breaks were left in the theatrical prints) and simplistic script, giving the film one out of five stars.

References

External links 
 

1956 films
1956 comedy films
American black-and-white films
American comedy films
Films about vacationing
Films based on radio series
Films directed by James V. Kern
Films set in Monaco
Films set in Paris
Films set in Yugoslavia
1950s English-language films
1950s American films
Lum and Abner